Liptena homeyeri is a butterfly in the family Lycaenidae. It is found in Tanzania, Zambia, the Democratic Republic of the Congo and Angola. The habitat consists of Brachystegia woodland.

Subspecies
 Liptena homeyeri homeyeri (Tanzania: M’pala, northern Zambia, south-eastern Angola, Democratic Republic of the Congo: Kivu, Sankuru, Lualaba and Shaba)
 Liptena homeyeri straminea Stempffer, Bennett & May, 1974 (Angola)

Etymology
The name honours Alexander von Homeyer

References

Butterflies described in 1884
Liptena
Butterflies of Africa
Taxa named by Hermann Dewitz